Inez is an unincorporated community in Holt County, Nebraska, United States.

History
A post office was established at Inez in the 1880s. Inez was likely named for a settler.

References

Unincorporated communities in Holt County, Nebraska
Unincorporated communities in Nebraska